Route 271 is a two-lane north/south highway on the south shore of the Saint Lawrence River in Quebec, Canada. Its northern terminus is in Sainte-Croix at the junction of Route 132, and the southern terminus is at the junction of Route 173 in Saint-Georges.

Towns along Route 271

 Sainte-Croix
 Notre-Dame-du-Sacré-Coeur-d'Issoudun 
 Laurier-Station
 Saint-Flavien
 Dosquet
 Sainte-Agathe-de-Lotbinière
 Saint-Jacques-de-Leeds
 Saint-Pierre-de-Broughton
 Sacré-Coeur-de-Jésus
 Sainte-Clotide-de-Beauce
 Saint-Éphrem-de-Beauce
 Saint-Benoît-Labre
 Saint-Georges

See also
 List of Quebec provincial highways

References

External links  
 Route 271 on Google Maps
 Provincial Route Map (Courtesy of the Quebec Ministry of Transportation) 

271
Saint-Georges, Quebec